About 25 km from the oasis of Djanet in southeast Algeria, on the eastern border of erg Admer towards Tassili n'Ajjer in the Tigharghart region, stands a large sand monolith. On one side of the rocks of the monolith are the rock engravings of La vache qui pleure (the crying cow), dated more than 7000 years ago.

The rock engravings of La vache qui pleure are a masterpiece of Neolithic sculpture. Carried out in bas-relief, the engravings are of extraordinary workmanship and harmony, made of deep grooves carved into the rock. Leaning towards a small depression at the foot of the rock, the engravings represent a small herd of bovidae. The cows seem to be waiting for the water to arrive to drink from it. The tear shed by one of these cows has given rise to many interpretations and legends.

A bas-relief in the sarcophagus of queen Khouit, wife of Pharaoh Mentuhotep II of the 11th Dynasty, also shows a tear falling from a cow's eye while it is being milked.

References

Illizi Province
Saharan rock art